Kai Johnny Mosaker (born 1974), known professionally as Trym Torson or just Trym, is a Norwegian drummer, formerly with Zyklon. Torson started playing in the Viking metal band Enslaved and was later invited to play in black metal band Emperor. He co-founded Zyklon together with Emperor member Samoth. His style is heavily influenced by jazz, and he is known for his fast playing, often consisting of blast beats and double-bass drumming. He is also a tattoo artist.

In 2007, Torson lent his voice to an animated character from the Adult Swim cartoon Metalocalypse, in the episode "Dethfashion". He also played on Egyptian artist Nader Sadek's Faceless project, contributing drums on the song Faithless written by Steve Tucker. Torson recorded most of the drums on the Abigail Williams album In the Shadow of a Thousand Suns.

Trym is most recently dabbling in filmmaking as a producer and actor. He began production on a feature film in April 2012, with his longtime friend, Stacy Paul Rugely, an established filmmaker and musician himself.

Bands 
Current and former bands
Emperor
Enslaved
Imperium
Satyricon – live session (2004)
Shadow Season
Paganize
 Ceremony (US death metal band)
Zyklon
Abigail Williams

References 

Living people
Norwegian black metal musicians
Norwegian heavy metal drummers
Male drummers
Tattoo artists
Place of birth missing (living people)
1974 births
Emperor (band) members
Zyklon members
Enslaved (band) members
21st-century Norwegian drummers
21st-century Norwegian male musicians